Asura septemmaculata is a moth of the family Erebidae. It is found on Java.

References

septemmaculata
Moths described in 1891
Moths of Indonesia